Aloinopsis rosulata is a species of succulent plant, native to Southern Africa. It is a wintergrower, and produces a thick tuber.  The flowers are pale pink with red stripes.

rosulata